Eastern Province and East Province may refer to the following places:

Eastern Province, Afghanistan
Eastern Province, Cameroon
Eastern Province, Cundinamarca, Venezuela
Eastern Province, Rwanda
Eastern Province (Kenya)
Eastern Province, Saudi Arabia (Al Sharqiyah)
Eastern Province, Sierra Leone
Eastern Cape, South Africa
Eastern Province cricket team
Eastern Province, Sri Lanka
Eastern Province, Zambia
Eastern Province (Victoria), a former electorate in the Victorian Legislative Council (Australia)
Khorasan (Eastern Province of Iran)
Roman and Byzantine Greece Greece as an eastern province of Roman Empire
Purvanchal, India, meaning "Eastern Province"

See also
Eastern Region (disambiguation)

Province name disambiguation pages